The economy of Mauritania is still largely based on agriculture and livestock, even though most of the nomads and many subsistence farmers were forced into the cities by recurring droughts in the 1970s and 1980s.

Mauritania has extensive deposits of iron ore, which account for almost 50% of total exports. The decline in world demand for this ore, however, has led to cutbacks in production. With the current rise in metal prices, gold and copper mining companies are opening mines in the interior.

The nation's coastal waters are among the richest fishing areas in the world, but overexploitation by foreigners threatens this key source of revenue. The country's first deep water port opened near Nouakchott in 1986.

In recent years, drought and economic mismanagement have resulted in a buildup of foreign debt. In March 1999, the government signed an agreement with a joint World Bank-International Monetary Fund mission on a $54 million enhanced structural adjustment facility (ESAF). The economic objectives have been set for 1999–2002. Privatization remains one of the key issues.

Macro-economic trends
This is a chart of trend of gross domestic product of Mauritania at market prices estimated by the International Monetary Fund with figures in millions of Mauritanian Ougulyas.

Current GDP per capita of Mauritania grew 82% in the Sixties reaching a peak growth of 166% in the Seventies. But this proved unsustainable and growth consequently scaled back to 14% in the Eighties. Finally, it shrank by 29% in the Nineties. Mean wages were $0.97 per man-hour in 2009.

The following table shows the main economic indicators in 1980–2017.

Diversification
In 2007, mining industries accounted for well over 35 percent of the Mauritanian economy, with the fish industry so much as 54% (with big changes between these industries in the power relationship).  Diversification of the economy into non-mining industries remains a long-term issue. Mauritania is a net importer of food, reportedly importing 70% of its domestic food needs.

Natural Gas and the Tortue/Ahmeyim Project
In 2015, Kosmos Energy made significant natural gas discoveries on the maritime border between Senegal and Mauritania, and in December 2016, it entered into partnership with British Petroleum. The two companies, along with Mauritanian and Senegalese governments and the two countries' national oil companies, are optimistic about the potential of these gas discoveries. The Grand Tortue/Ahmeyim reserves are estimated at 15 trillion cubic feet. According to BP,  'that's equivalent to all of Africa's current gas production for nearly seven years.'  The production phase will begin in 2022, starting with 2.3 million tons annually.

Dispute with Woodside Petroleum 
In February 2006, the Mauritanian government denounced amendments to an oil contract made by former leader Maaouiya Ould Taya with Woodside Petroleum, an Australian company.  In 2004, Woodside had agreed to invest $US 600 million in developing Mauritania's Chinguetti offshore oil project.  The controversial amendments, which Mauritanian authorities declared had been signed "outside the legal framework of normal practice, to the great detriment of our country", could cost Mauritania up to $200 million a year, according to BBC News.  Signed by Woodside two weeks after the February 1, 2005 legislation authorizing the four amendments, they provided for a lower state quota in the profit-oil, and reduced taxes by 15 percent in certain zones.  They also eased environmental constraints, and extended the length and scope of the exploitation and exploration monopoly, among other measures.

The disputed amendments were signed by former oil minister Zeidane Ould Hmeida in February 2004 and March 2005.  Hmeida was arrested in January 2006 on charges of "serious crimes against the country's essential economic interests".

Nouakchott's authorities declared that the government would likely seek international arbitration, which Woodside (which operated for Hardman, BG Group, Premier Oil, ROC Oil, Fusion, Petronas, Dana Petroleum, Energy Africa and the Hydrocarbons Mauritanian Society) also contemplated.

At the end of December 2005, authorities estimated that in 2006, the oil profits would be 47 billion ouguiyas (about US$180 million) and represent a quarter of the state budget, according to RFI.

Some U.S. oil companies are alleged to be playing a part in Mauritania's oil related corruption.

Electricity 

Mauritania has 380 MW of generating capacity, of which 263 MW are fossil fuels and 117 MW are renewable. Its sunny weather makes solar power highly favorable, and eight plants totaling 16.6 MW were installed with the support of Masdar in 2016.

See also
Economy of Africa
Slavery in Mauritania
 List of companies based in Mauritania
 United Nations Economic Commission for: Africa & Western Asia

References

External links

Mauritania latest trade data on ITC Trade Map

 

 
Mauritania
Economy of the Arab League
Mauritania